A granny square is a piece of square fabric produced in crochet by working in rounds from the center outward.  Granny squares are traditionally handmade as crochet cannot be manufactured by machine.  They resemble coarse lace.  Although there is no theoretical limit to the maximum size of a granny square, crocheters usually create multiple small squares (called "motifs") and assemble the pieces to make clothing, purses, Afghan blankets, and other household textiles.

Granny square apparel is a cyclical fashion that peaked in the 1970s.  As Stitch 'n Bitch series author Debbie Stoller describes:

Although particular color and pattern schemes for granny squares change with time, this class of motif is a staple among crocheters.  Multicolor granny squares are an effective way to use up small amounts of yarn left over from other projects and basic granny square motifs do not require advanced skills to execute.

History 

The earliest known example of a traditional granny square, designed by a Mrs. Phelps, was published in the April 5, 1885 edition of Prairie Farmer. She wrote:

The "crazy work" she refers to is crazy quilting, which was a popular trend at the time. During this era, it was traditional for women to use black ribbon on the borders between crazy quilt squares - much like the black borders of a traditional granny square.

The granny square motif reappeared in the 1930s, and the pattern was featured in publications such as Fleisher's Afghans.

Construction 

According to Edie Eckman in The Crochet Answer Book,

Any granny square begins with a small loop of chain stitches.  Basic granny squares alternate sets of double stitches and chain stitches.  Variant patterns use different stitch types or produce other geometric shapes such as hexagons.  In order to achieve a distinct angle at the corners the designer uses extra chain stitches.  Subsequent rounds are added by wrapping multiple stitches around the existing chain stitches.  Hundreds of variant motifs are in use and entire books have been devoted to granny square designs.

References

Further reading 
Cottrell, Susan; & Cindy Weloth. The New Granny Square, Ogden, Utah: Lark/Chapelle, 2006.

External links 

Granny square tutorial

Crochet